This article lists the agents and governors of Liberia, consisting of fourteen agents and two governors of the American Colonization Society from 1822 until Liberian independence in 1847. The last governor, Joseph Jenkins Roberts, also served as the first President of Liberia of Liberia after independence was gained.

The colors indicate the race of each agent or governor.

List of Agents and Governors of Liberia

  Became the first president of Liberia in January 1848

See also
Americo-Liberians
History of Liberia
Mississippi-in-Africa
Republic of Maryland (Maryland-in-Africa)

References
 
 
 

Agents and Governors of Liberia
Liberia
Agents and Governors